Aphaenops bessoni is a species of beetle in the subfamily Trechinae. It was described by Cabidoche in 1962.

References

bessoni
Beetles described in 1962